Errani is a surname. Notable people with the surname include:

Sara Errani (born 1987), Italian tennis player
Vasco Errani (born 1955), Italian politician
Achille Errani (1823–1897), Italian opera singer

Italian-language surnames